Armenia has competed at the IAAF World Athletics Championships on fourteen occasions, sending a delegation from 1993 onwards. Prior to 1993, its athletes participated as part of the Soviet Union team. Armenia's competing country code is ARM. The country has not won any medals at the competition and as of 2019 no Armenian athlete has placed within the top eight of an event. Its best performance is by Robert Emmiyan, who placed eleventh in the men's long jump final at the 1995 World Championships in Athletics. Emmiyan previously won a silver medal for the Soviet Union.

2019
Armenia competed at the 2019 World Athletics Championships in Doha, Qatar, from 27 September to 6 October 2019. Armenia were represented by sole athlete Levon Aghasyan, who participated in the men's triple jump event.

References 

 
Armenia
World Championships in Athletics